Universal Reality Combat Championship (URCC) is the first and only professional mixed martial arts promotion based in the Philippines. Its inaugural event was held at the Casino Filipino Amphitheater in Parañaque, Philippines on November 23, 2002. The URCC is under the supervision of the Games and Amusements Board (GAB), the government agency that sanctions games such as billiards, boxing and basketball. The URCC was founded in 2002 by Filipino BJJ Black belt Alvin Aguilar.  The matches and events of the URCC aired on ABS-CBN Sports and Action and ABS-CBN Sports and Action HD, URCC's official broadcast partner.

Notable fights and fighters
A number of URCC fighters have gone on to enjoy success fighting for mainstream MMA promotions. Chinese fighter Tiequan Zhang who fought at URCC 15 went on to fight for the WEC and the UFC and is currently ranked as one of the top featherweights in the world. Dave "The Scarecrow" Galera, who won the URCC Interim Bantamweight at URCC 23 is the first homegrown Filipino Fighter to be signed by the UFC.<ref> </ </ref>

Kevin Belingon, Eduard Folayang, Eric Kelly and Angelito Manguray all fought for ESPN Star Sports promotion Martial Combat in 2010  while Folayang and Kelly both won fights at ONE Fighting Championship: Champion vs. Champion on September 3, 2011.

Actors Baron Geisler and Kiko Matos, who involved in a feud in May 2016 in a bar, were faced in an exhibition match during the URCC Fight Night card held at the Valkyrie at the Palace last June 25, 2016. This two-round fight, however ended in a unanimous draw. After which, both Geisler and Matos reconciled with each other.

AT URCC 28: Vindication, the first-ever 3-on-3 MMA exhibition match took place. The teams who competed were Team Chan and Team Estroso. All competitors were inside the cage simultaneously with three referees in charge of the action. The fight is momentarily halted after a competitor gets knocked or is unable to continue. Team Estroso won the fight with two of its fighters still standing while Team Chan was left with one.

On January 7, 2017, URCC held its first fight card in the United States of America.

URCC held its second event in the United States in September 2017 in San Mateo, California. Officially called "URCC 32: Fury", the event was hosted at the San Mateo County event center and featured 3 title fights, as well as amateur fights sanctioned under California Amateur Mixed Martial Arts Organization (CAMO).

Events

Rules

URCC-USA
All URCC fights hosted in the United States abide by the rules in place by the athletic commission of each respective state.

URCC
URCC's rules are different from those of established promotions.

Match length
URCC matches consist of two rounds, each lasting ten minutes. Intermissions between each round are two minutes in length. All title bouts will have a 5-minute third round in case of a draw after the two rounds.

Weight classes

Ring
The URCC uses a five-roped square ring from 2002 until 2013.
On the 2014 event URCC 25: Take Over, the first URCC circular cage was released and planned to use it as official ring to the rest of the URCC history

Attire
URCC allows fighters latitude in their choice of attire but 4-ounce fingerless gloves and a mouthguard are mandatory. Shoes and derogatory markings on ring attire are forbidden. It is within a fighter's discretion to use other protective equipment such as groin guards.

Victory
Matches are won via:
 Submission
Physical tap out
Verbal tap out
 Knockout
A fighter falls from a legal blow and is either unconscious or unable to immediately continue.
 Technical Knockout
 Referee Stoppage (the referee stops the match after seeing that one fighter is completely dominant to the point of endangering his opponent).
 Doctor Stoppage (the referee stops the match in the event that a fighter is injured via a legal blow and the ring doctor determines that he cannot continue).
 Forfeited Match (a fighter's corner throws in the towel).
 Decision
If the match reaches its time limit then the outcome of the bout is determined by the three judges. The fight is scored by a 10-point must system per round.  A three step procedure per round is followed:
 Determine winner of round (can be draw),
 Determine if winner dominated round ,
 Fouls then factored in (subtract one point per foul from fighter).
Draws are acceptable in URCC matches.
 Disqualification
A "warning" will be given in the form of a yellow card or a red card (any fighter who executes a foul technique shall be penalized with a talent fee reduction) when a fighter commits an illegal action or does not follow the referee's instruction. Two yellow cards shall lead to a disqualification "red card."
 The referee's decision will always depend upon the level of violation committed by a fighter whether it is intentional or unintentional. Therefore, the referee may execute the "red card" even without showing the first two "yellow cards" as a caution for a disqualification
 The referees are also authorized to execute the red "disqualification" card if a fighter has deliberately injured his opponent and can no longer compete.

Fouls
URCC considers the following to be fouls:

 Head butting.
 Eye gouging.
 Hair pulling.
 Biting.
 Fish hooking.
 Any attacks to the groin
 Strikes to the back of the head, which includes the occipital region and the spine. The sides of the head and the area around the ears are not considered to be the back of the head. (see Rabbit punch)
 Small joint manipulation (control of four or more fingers/toes is necessary).
 Intentionally throwing your opponent out of the ring.
 Running out of the ring.
 Purposely holding the ropes. Fighters cannot purposely hang an arm or leg on the ropes and it will result in an immediate warning.
 Putting a finger into any orifice or into any cut or laceration on an opponent.
 Striking downward using the point of the elbow.
 Throat strikes of any kind including without limitation, grabbing the trachea.
 Clawing, pinching or twisting the flesh.
 Grabbing the clavicle.
 Kicking the head of a grounded opponent.
 Kneeing the head of a grounded opponent.
 Stomping on a grounded opponent.
 Kicking to the kidney with a heel.
 Spiking an opponent to the canvas on his head or neck.
 Throwing an opponent out of the ring or fenced area.
 Holding the shorts or gloves of an opponent.
 Spitting at an opponent.
 Engaging in an unsportsmanlike conduct that causes an injury to an opponent.
 Using abusive language in the ring or fenced area.
 Attacking an opponent on or during the break.
 Attacking an opponent who is under the care of the referee.
 Attacking an opponent after the bell has sounded the end of the period of unarmed combat.
 Flagrantly disregarding the instruction of the referee.
 Timidity, including without limitation, avoiding contact with an opponent, intentionally or consistently dropping the mouthpiece or faking an injury.
 Interference by the corner.
 Throwing in the towel during competition.
 Exceeding numbers of cornermen.
 Unauthorized cornerman.
 Any lock which puts strain on the neck joint.

Match conduct
 If both fighters are on the verge of falling out of the ring or become entangled in the ropes, the referee will stop the action. The fighters must immediately stop their movements and will then be repositioned in the center of the ring in the same position. Once they are comfortably repositioned, they resume at the referee's instruction.

Current champions
Men

Women

References

External links
URCC Official Website
MMA Manila
Gracie Barra Philippines Official Website
List of Events on Sherdog

2002 establishments in the Philippines
Mixed martial arts organizations
Mixed martial arts events lists
Sports in Metro Manila